Dylan de Beer (born 20 February 1982) is a former Zimbabwean cricketer. He was born in Port Elizabeth, Cape Province, South Africa. A wicket-keeper and opening batsman, he played three first-class matches for Manicaland during the 2002–03 Logan Cup.

References

External links
 
 

1982 births
Living people
Cricketers from Port Elizabeth
Manicaland cricketers
Zimbabwean cricketers
South African emigrants to Zimbabwe
Wicket-keepers